Henry Township is one of eight townships in Fulton County, Indiana. As of the 2010 census, its population was 3,048 and it contained 1,224 housing units.

History
When Fulton County was organized in January of 1836, Henry Township was a part of Rochester Township, and remained this way until 1838. However, no one settled in the township until February of 1836, when four men settled there with their families. Henry Township is named after Henry Hoover, who was, at the time of naming, the oldest resident of the township.

The Prill School and Utter-Gerig Round Barn are listed on the National Register of Historic Places.

Geography

Cities and towns
 Akron

Unincorporated towns
 Athens
 Lowman Corner
(This list is based on USGS data and may include former settlements.)

Adjacent townships
 Franklin Township, Kosciusko County (north)
 Seward Township, Kosciusko County (northeast)
 Pleasant Township, Wabash County (east)
 Perry Township, Miami County (southeast)
 Allen Township, Miami County (southwest)
 Rochester Township (west)
 Newcastle Township (northwest)

Major highways
  Indiana State Road 14
  Indiana State Road 19
  Indiana State Road 114

Cemeteries
The township contains two cemeteries: Independent Order of Odd Fellows and Mount Hope Athens.

Education
Henry Township residents may obtain a free library card from the Akron Carnegie Public Library in Akron.

References
 
 United States Census Bureau cartographic boundary files

External links
 Indiana Township Association
 United Township Association of Indiana

Townships in Fulton County, Indiana
Townships in Indiana